St Paul's Church, Little Eaton is a Grade II listed parish church in the Church of England in Little Eaton, Derbyshire.

History
Construction of the church started in 1791 and it was consecrated on 9 July 1791 by the Bishop of Lichfield, James Cornwallis.  It was enlarged in 1837 when capacity was double to accommodate 300 people, again in 1851 when the chancel and tower were added by Henry Isaac Stevens, and restored in 1869 by Giles and Brookhouse, when a north aisle was added, the nave roof was raised and the church re-roofed.

Present day
The church is in a joint ecclesiastical parish with St Alkmund's Church, Duffield, being formerly within Duffield Frith.

St Paul's is within the Conservative Evangelical tradition of the Church of England. As a parish that rejects the leadership/ordination of women, it receives alternative episcopal oversight from the Bishop of Maidstone (currently Rod Thomas).

Monuments
John Tempest (d. 1863) by J B Robinson of Derby
William Tempest (d. 1842) by N Coulson

Organ
An organ chamber was constructed in 1880, and a pipe organ by Alfred Kirkland was installed in 1905. A specification of the organ can be found on the National Pipe Organ Register.

See also
Listed buildings in Little Eaton

References

Church of England church buildings in Derbyshire
Grade II listed churches in Derbyshire